University of Goroka is a university in the Eastern Highlands Province of Papua New Guinea. It provides teaching in three schools (Education, Science & Technology, and Humanities) and in three institutes (Postgraduate Studies, Technical Vocational Education & Training and Distance & Flexible Learning). The university also runs a consulting arm, 'UniGor Consultancy Limited', with projects of nearly 7 million kina.

The current vice chancellor is Professor Musawe Sinebare. The pro vice-chancellors are Mr. Donald Gumbis and Dr.Sam Najike.

History 
The university was originally established in 1965 as a primary teachers' college. In 1967, it became a secondary teachers' college, and in 1992, a campus of the University of Papua New Guinea. In January 1997, the campus was independently established as the University of Goroka.

Affiliation
Association of Commonwealth Universities

References

External links
University homepage

 
University of Goroka
Educational institutions established in 1965
Goroka
1965 establishments in Papua New Guinea